Lokomotiv-Bilajary FK, was an Azerbaijani football club based in Biləcəri, Baku.

History
The club was founded in 2011, which is based on FK Baku's under 17 team that won Azerbaijani championship.

In February 2015 the club was dissolved, with the players not being paid for over a year.

League and domestic cup history

References

External links 
 Lokomotiv-Bilajary FK at PFL.AZ

Lokomotiv-Bilajary FK
Railway association football teams
Association football clubs established in 2011
2011 establishments in Azerbaijan
Association football clubs disestablished in 2015
2015 disestablishments in Azerbaijan